Timothy Thomas Powers (born February 29, 1952) is an American science fiction and fantasy author. Powers has won the World Fantasy Award twice for his critically acclaimed novels Last Call and Declare.  His 1987 novel On Stranger Tides served as inspiration for the Monkey Island franchise of video games and was optioned for adaptation into the fourth Pirates of the Caribbean film.

Most of Powers' novels are "secret histories". He uses actual, documented historical events featuring famous people, but shows another view of them in which occult or supernatural factors heavily influence the motivations and actions of the characters.

Typically, Powers strictly adheres to established historical facts. He reads extensively on a given subject, and the plot develops as he notes inconsistencies, gaps and curious data; regarding his 2001 novel Declare, he stated, "I made it an ironclad rule that I could not change or disregard any of the recorded facts, nor rearrange any days of the calendar – and then I tried to figure out what momentous but unrecorded fact could explain them all."

Life and career

Powers was born in Buffalo, New York, but has lived in California since 1959. He studied English Literature at Cal State Fullerton, and earned his B.A. in 1976.  It was there that he first met James Blaylock and K. W. Jeter, both of whom remained close friends and occasional collaborators; the trio have half-seriously referred to themselves as "steampunks" in contrast to the prevailing cyberpunk genre of the 1980s. Powers and Blaylock invented the poet William Ashbless while they were at Cal State Fullerton.

Another friend Powers first met during this period was noted science fiction writer Philip K. Dick; the character named "David" in Dick's novel VALIS is based on Powers. When Do Androids Dream of Electric Sheep? was retitled Blade Runner to tie-in with the movie based on the novel, Dick dedicated it to Tim and Serena Powers.

Powers' first major novel was The Drawing of the Dark (1979), but the novel that earned him wide praise was  The Anubis Gates, which won the Philip K. Dick Award, and has since been published in many other languages.

Powers also teaches part-time in his role as Writer in Residence for the Orange County High School of the Arts and California School of the Arts in San Gabriel Valley in the Creative Writing Conservatory, as well as Chapman University, where Blaylock taught. He also taught part-time at the University of Redlands.

Powers and his wife, Serena Batsford Powers, currently live in Muscoy, California. He has frequently served as a mentor author as part of the Clarion science fiction/fantasy writer's workshop.

Bibliography

Novels
 The Skies Discrowned (1976)
 
 Revised as: 

 An Epitaph in Rust (1976)
 Also published as Epitaph in Rust. The publisher's cover blurb describes a tale that "follows young Thomas from his escape from a rural monastery into the wilds of a future Los Angeles. There he joins a theater company where the play is definitely not the thing – revolution is – and he finds himself in the middle of it. The mayor has been blown up and his android guards are determined to end insurrection. But the theater company has other ideas..."

 The Drawing of the Dark (1979)
 The siege of Vienna was actually a struggle between Muslim and Christian magicians over the spiritual center of the West, which happens to be a small inn and brewery in Vienna. The "dark" is a beer that has been brewing for centuries, which the Fisher King will eventually drink.

 The Anubis Gates (1983) Philip K. Dick Award winner, 1983; Locus Fantasy Award nominee, 1984; BSFA nominee, 1985
 A time travel story set mostly in 1810, featuring a brainwashed Lord Byron, magic, Egyptian gods and a werewolf.

 Dinner at Deviant's Palace (1985) Philip K. Dick Award winner, and Nebula Award nominee, 1985
 Unusually for Powers, this is set in the future, in a postatomic America in which an extraterrestrial psychic vampire is slowly taking over.
 In 2001 the group Cradle of Filth released a song entitled "Dinner at Deviant's Palace" that was simply the Lord's Prayer backmasked.

 On Stranger Tides (1987) Locus Fantasy and World Fantasy Awards nominee, 1988
 Set in the 18th century Caribbean; with pirates (many of them real characters, primarily Blackbeard, as well as a fictional protagonist named Jack), voodoo, zombies, Juan Ponce de León, and a strangely quantum-mechanical Fountain of Youth. Disney incorporated elements of the novel into the fourth Pirates of the Caribbean film.

 The Stress of Her Regard (1989) Locus Fantasy and World Fantasy Awards nominee, 1990 and winner of the 1990 Mythopoeic Fantasy Award.
 Concerning the dealings of the Romantic poets – Byron and Shelley are major characters – with vampire-like beings from Greek mythology, François Villon being also mentioned as minor character. Reprinted in 2008 with Tachyon Publications.
 
 Fault Lines series
 Last Call (1992) Locus Fantasy and World Fantasy Awards winner, 1993
 A professional poker player finds out that he lost far more than he won in a poker game played with Tarot cards two decades ago.
 Expiration Date (1996) World Fantasy Award nominee, 1996; 1996 Nebula Award nominee
 A boy possessed by the spirit of Thomas Edison is hunted through Los Angeles by people wanting to consume the ghost he carries.
 Earthquake Weather (1997) BSFA Award nominee, 1997; Locus Fantasy Award winner, 1998
 Sequel to both Last Call and Expiration Date, involving the characters of both: two fugitives from a psychiatric hospital, the magical nature of multiple personality disorder, and the secret history of wine production in California.

 Declare (2001) World Fantasy Award winner and Locus Fantasy nominee, 2001; 2001 Nebula Award nominee
 A Cold War espionage thriller which evokes Lovecraftian horror and the work of John le Carré, involving Kim Philby, djinn and the Ark on Mount Ararat.

 Powers of Two (2004)
 Re-release of Skies Discrowned and Epitaph in Rust.

 Three Days to Never (2006) Locus Fantasy Award nominee, 2007

 Hide Me Among the Graves (2012) A sequel of sorts to The Stress of Her Regard, it involves the Rossetti family and John Crawford, son of the protagonist from The Stress of Her Regard.

 Medusa's Web (2016) A standalone novel where Scott and Madeline Madden uncover the secrets of the Hollywood mansion Caveat, a "conduit for the supernatural".

 Vickery and Castine series
 Alternate Routes (August 2018)
 Forced Perspectives (March 2020)
 Stolen Skies (January 2022)

 More Walls Broken (February 2019)

Short story collections
 Night Moves and Other Stories (2000)
 On Pirates, by James P. Blaylock and Powers as William Ashbless (2001)
 The Devils in the Details (with James Blaylock) (2003)
 Strange Itineraries: 2005, published by Tachyon Publications of San Francisco, California (includes all six stories from Night Moves plus both stories by Powers from Devils)
 The Bible Repairman and Other Stories: 2011, published by Tachyon Publications
 Down and Out in Purgatory: The Collected Stories of Tim Powers: 2017, published by Baen Books

Other
 The Complete Twelve Hours of the Night (1986): A joke pamphlet by Blaylock and Powers as  William Ashbless, published by Cheap Street Press; features in The Anubis Gates
 A Short Poem by William Ashbless (1987): A joke chapbook written by Phil Garland, with permission of Blaylock and Powers as Ashbless. Published by The Folly Press.
 The William Ashbless Memorial Cookbook (2002): A cookbook by Blaylock and Powers as Ashbless. Published by Subterranean Press.
 The Bible Repairman (2005): A chapbook containing an original short story. Published by Subterranean Press.
 Nine Sonnets by Francis Thomas Marrity (2006): A chapbook containing nine sonnets "written" by one of the main characters in Three Days to Never. Published by Subterranean Press and given away with the collectors' edition of Three Days To Never.
 A Soul in a Bottle (2007): A ghost story about a poet largely based on American poet Edna St Vincent Millay. This novella published by Subterranean Press.
 Three Sonnets by Cheyenne Fleming (2007): Printed loose and inserted into the collectors' edition of A Soul in a Bottle.
 Death of a Citizen (2012): A short nonfiction essay included in A Comprehensive Dual Bibliography of James P. Blaylock & Tim Powers by Silver Smith. Published by Argent Leaf Press.
 Salvage and Demolition (2013): Time-travel novella. Published by Subterranean Press.
 Nobody's Home (2014): novella set in the world of The Anubis Gates.
 Appointment at Sunset (2014): Published by Charnel House
 Down and Out in Purgatory (2016): A ghost story about posthumous revenge. This novella was published by Subterranean Press.

Critical studies and reviews of Powers' work
Salvage and Demolition

References

External links

  – includes a very long interview
 
 Bibliographical list of book reviews published in Locus magazine
 

 
1952 births
20th-century American male writers
20th-century American novelists
21st-century American male writers
21st-century American novelists
American fantasy writers
American male novelists
American science fiction writers
California State University, Fullerton alumni
Chapbook writers
Living people
Novelists from New York (state)
Waltham High School alumni
World Fantasy Award-winning writers
Writers from Buffalo, New York
Writers from California